Black-eyed bulbul refers to one of the following species:

 Common bulbul (Pycnonotus barbatus)
 Dark-capped bulbul (Pycnonotus tricolor)